Balistomorphus is an extinct genus of prehistoric triggerfish that lived a marine environment during the early Oligocene epoch in what is now Canton Glarus, Switzerland.

See also

 Prehistoric fish
 List of prehistoric bony fish

References

Oligocene fish
Balistidae
Paleogene animals of Europe